Nonoai ("João Pereira de Almeida, Baron of Nonoai") is a bairro in the District of Sede in the municipality of Santa Maria, in the Brazilian state of Rio Grande do Sul. It is located in central Santa Maria.

Villages 
The bairro contains the following villages: Conjunto Residencial João Rolim, Nonoai, Parque Residencial Jardim Tamanday, Parque Residencial Panorama, Vila Nonoai.

References 

Bairros of Santa Maria, Rio Grande do Sul